The Last Waltz is a 1934 German operetta film directed by Georg Jacoby, and starring Ernst Dumcke, Max Gülstorff, and Iván Petrovich. It is based on the 1920 operetta The Last Waltz by Oscar Straus. It was remade in English in 1936.

Cast

See also
The Last Waltz (1927)
The Last Waltz (UK, 1936)
The Last Waltz (France, 1936)
The Last Waltz (1953)

References

External links

1934 musical films
German musical films
Operetta films
Films based on operettas
Films of Nazi Germany
Films directed by Georg Jacoby
Films set in Russia
Films set in the 1900s
Remakes of German films
Sound film remakes of silent films
German black-and-white films
Films scored by Oscar Straus
1930s German films